Elections to the Australian Capital Territory Legislative Assembly were held on Saturday, 21 February 1998. The incumbent Liberal Party, led by Kate Carnell, was challenged by the Labor Party, led by Wayne Berry. Candidates were elected to fill three multi-member electorates using a single transferable vote method, known as the Hare-Clark system. The result was another hung parliament. However the Liberals, with the largest representation in the 17-member unicameral Assembly, formed Government with the support of independents Michael Moore, Paul Osborne, and Dave Rugendyke. Carnell was elected Chief Minister at the first sitting of the fourth Assembly on 19 March 1998.

Subsequent to the election and during the life of the fourth Assembly, on 18 October 2000, Carnell stepped down as Chief Minister and was replaced by Gary Humphries.

This would be the last time the Liberal Party (or the Coalition) would form government at a state or territory level after an election until the 2008 Western Australian state election. Also, this is the last time the Liberal Party has formed government after an election in the ACT.

Key dates

 Close of party registration: 15 January 1998
 Pre-election period commenced/nominations opened: 16 January 1998
 Rolls closed: 23 January 1998
 Nominations closed: 29 January 1998
 Nominations declared/ballot paper order determined: 30 January 1998
 Pre-poll voting commenced: 2 February 1998
 Polling day: 21 February 1998
 Poll declared: 17 March 1998

Overview

Candidates

Sitting members at the time of the election are listed in bold. Tickets that elected at least one MLA are highlighted in the relevant colour. Successful candidates are indicated by an asterisk (*).

Retiring Members

Greens
 Lucy Horodny (Ginninderra)

Brindabella
Five seats were up for election. The Labor Party was defending two seats. The Liberal Party was defending two seats. The Paul Osborne Independent Group was defending one seat.

Ginninderra
Five seats were up for election. The Labor Party was defending two seats. The Liberal Party was defending two seats. The Greens were defending one seat.

Molonglo
Seven seats were up for election. The Labor Party was defending two seats. The Liberal Party was defending three seats. The Greens were defending one seat. The Moore Independents were defending one seat.

Results

|}

M - Moore Independents
O - Osborne Independent Group

See also
 Members of the Australian Capital Territory Legislative Assembly, 1998–2001
 Second Carnell Ministry
 Humphries Ministry
 List of Australian Capital Territory elections

References

External links
 ACT Electoral Commission
 ACT Legislative Assembly - List of Members (1989 - 2008)

Elections in the Australian Capital Territory
1998 elections in Australia
February 1998 events in Australia
1990s in the Australian Capital Territory